The 1913 Colorado Agricultural Aggies football team represented Colorado Agricultural College (now known as Colorado State University) in the Rocky Mountain Conference (RMC) during the 1913 college football season.  In their third season under head coach Harry W. Hughes, the Aggies compiled a 3–2 record and outscored opponents by a total of 115 to 43.

Schedule

References

Colorado Agricultural
Colorado State Rams football seasons
Colorado Agricultural Aggies football